Khachatryan or Khachatrian is an Armenian surname.  It can refer to the following people:

 Aleksandr Khachatryan (born 1947), Armenian actor
 Alisa Khachatryan, Armenian women's footballer
 Andranik Khachatryan (born 1956), Armenian footballer
 Ara Khachatryan (born 1982), Armenian weightlifter
 Arkadi Khachatryan (born 1975), Armenian politician
 Armine Khachatryan (born 1986), Armenian women's footballer
 Artur Khachatryan (born 1983), Armenian boxer
 Ashot Khachatryan (born 1959), Armenian footballer
 Eva Khachatryan (born 1990), Armenian actress
 Gagik Khachatryan (politician), Armenian politician
 Gagik Khachatryan (weightlifter) (born 1971), Armenian weightlifter
 Garegin Khachatryan (1975–1995), Armenian sculptor, artist and a dissident
 Gevorg Khachatrian (1936–1996), Armenian scientist
 Harutyun Khachatryan (born 1955), Armenian film director
 Karen Khachatrian (born 1962), Armenian scientist
 Kristine Khachatryan, Armenian cross-country skier
 Marinka Khachatryan, Armenian actress
 Mher Khachatryan (born 1989), Armenian actor
 Mher Khachatryan (painter) (born 1983), Armenian painter
 Rafik Khachatryan (1937–1993), Armenian sculptor
 Romik Khachatryan (born 1978), Armenian football player
 Samson Khachatryan (born 1960), Armenian boxer
 Sargis Khachatryan (born 1964), Armenian footballer
 Sargis Khachatryan (wrestler), Brazilian wrestler
 Sergey Khachatryan (born 1985), Armenian violinist
 Shahen Khachatrian (born 1934), Armenian art historian
 Suren Khachatryan (born 1956), Armenian politician
 Tiran Khachatryan (born 1977), Armenian general
 Vardan Khachatryan (born 1968), Armenian football player
 Vahagn Khachatryan (born 1959), Armenian politician
 Vladik Khachatryan, politician from the Republic of Artsakh

and objects:
 18174 Khachatryan

See also 

 Khachaturian

Armenian-language surnames
Patronymic surnames